David "Sid" John Howlett (born 24 November 1951) is a British sailor. He competed at the 1976 Summer Olympics and the 1992 Summer Olympics. He went on to coaching supporting both Iain Percy and Ben Ainslie to Olympic Gold.

References

External links
 

1951 births
Living people
British male sailors (sport)
Olympic sailors of Great Britain
Sailors at the 1976 Summer Olympics – Finn
Sailors at the 1992 Summer Olympics – Star
People from Wellingborough
World champions in sailing for Great Britain
Etchells class world champions